Charles Powlett (sometimes spelled Paulet), 3rd Duke of Bolton  (3 September 168526 August 1754), styled Earl of Wiltshire from 1685 until 1699, and Marquess of Winchester from 1699 until 1722, was a British landowner and Whig politician who sat in the English House of Commons from 1705 to 1708 and in the British House of Commons between 1708 and 1717, when he was raised to the peerage as Lord Powlett and sat in the House of Lords.

Early life
Powlett was born in 1685 at Chawton, Hampshire, the eldest son of Charles Paulet, 2nd Duke of Bolton, and his second wife Frances Ramsden, daughter of William Ramsden of Byram, Yorkshire. He was educated at Enfield School although his father had to remove him in 1699 for absenteeism and unruly behaviour. He travelled abroad with Anthony Ashley from 1700 to 1704. In 1705 he was a volunteer in the Portuguese campaign.

Political career
Powlett was home in time to stand successfully as Whig at a by-election for Lymington on 7 December 1705. In 1708, he was elected MP for Hampshire in a close contest. However, the church interest supported the Tories following the Sacheverell trial, and he was defeated there in 1710 and 1713. In 1714 he was appointed Gentleman of the bedchamber to the Prince of Wales.

At the 1715 general election, Powlett was returned as MP for Carmarthenshire. In the same year he was appointed Governor of Milford Haven and Vice-Admiral of South Wales. He was also appointed Lord Lieutenant of Carmarthenshire and Glamorgan. He was created Lord Powlett of Basing on 12 April 1717 and had to give up his seat in the House of Commons. He became Colonel of the Royal Horse Guards in 1717.

In 1722 he succeeded to his father's estates and to the Dukedom of Bolton, making him one of the largest landowners in Hampshire and bringing control of some parliamentary seats; thus he became one of the principal electoral managers for the Whig government.  He was appointed High Steward of Winchester, Warden of the New Forest and Lord Lieutenant of Hampshire and Dorset in the same year. He became a Privy Councillor on 1 June 1725 and was Lord Justice for the year 1725 to 1726. In 1726 he was appointed Commissioner for surveying lands for naval docks and Governor of the Isle of Wight.

In 1733 Powlett voted against the government and was dismissed from all his posts. In 1739, he became a founding governor of the Foundling Hospital in London, an orphanage for abandoned children. He became captain of the gentlemen pensioners in 1740. He was reconciled to Walpole and in 1742 was re-appointed to nearly all his previous posts, but he lost them all again in 1746.

Jockey Club
He apparently founded an early form of the Jockey Club. A notice of 1729 records that “The Jockey Club, consisting of several Noblemen and Gentlemen, are to meet one Day next Week at Hackwood, the Duke of Bolton’s Seat in Hampshire, to consider of the Methods for the better keeping of their respective Strings of Horses at New Market.” In 1733 another newspaper noted he was going "to dine with the Jockey Club, at William's Coffee-house, St. James's."

Family

On 21 July 1713, he married Lady Anne Vaughan, a daughter of the 3rd Earl of Carbery. The marriage was not a happy one, and there were no children. In 1728, he began a long-standing affair with the well-known London actress, Lavinia Fenton. Lady Anne died in 1751 and the Duke married Lavinia Fenton on 20 October 1751 at Aix-en-Provence. She had already borne him three illegitimate sons: Charles, Percy, and Horatio Armand Powlett.

The third Duke of Bolton died in 1754, aged 68, at Royal Tunbridge Wells and was buried at Basing.

See also

List of deserters from James II to William of Orange
Winchester, New Hampshire, named in honour of Powlett as the Marquess of Winchester

References

|-

1685 births
1754 deaths
British Army lieutenant generals
English MPs 1705–1707
Winchester, Charles Powlett, Marquess of
Winchester, Charles Powlett, Marquess of
Winchester, Charles Powlett, Marquess of
Knights of the Garter
Lord-Lieutenants of Glamorgan
Lord-Lieutenants of Dorset
Lord-Lieutenants of Hampshire
Lord-Lieutenants of the Tower Hamlets
Winchester, Charles Powlett, Marquess of
Winchester, Charles Powlett, Marquess of
Members of the Privy Council of Great Britain
Honourable Corps of Gentlemen at Arms
Royal Horse Guards officers
Charles
13
British racehorse owners and breeders
Peers of Great Britain created by George I
People from Chawton